Filip Stanimirov Filipov (born 2 August 1988) is a Bulgarian former footballer who played as a defender.

Career

Early career
Filipov start to play football in Litex Lovech. In June 2007 signed with Lokomotiv Mezdra.

He made his competitive debut for Loko Mezdra in Bulgarian top division on 9 August 2008 against Spartak Varna in the first round of the season 2008–09. In season 2007–08, Filipov earned 12 appearances playing with the team in second division.

Botev Plovdiv

In August 2013 Filipov was transferred to Botev Plovdiv upon request of the manager Stanimir Stoilov for undisclosed fee and he signed a 3-year contract. In his first season, he took part in 8 games in A Grupa and 2 games for the Bulgarian Cup.

In the summer of 2014 Filipov remained in Botev Plovdiv despite the financial crisis in the team. Velislav Vutsov preferred to use Bozhidar Vasev and Yordan Hristov as left and right defender therefore Filipov remained on the bench in most games. After the replacement of Vutsov as a manager, Petar Penchev started to use Bozhidar Vasev as a midfielder and Filipov or Lazar Marin were more often included in the starting lineup on the left side of the defense. Filipov played during the -0-2 away win over Lokomotiv Plovdiv, 2-0 home win over CSKA Sofia and the 0-0 draw during the visit to Ludogorets Razgrad.

On 9 February 2018 Filipov returned to Botev Plovdiv.

International career
Filipov made his debut for Bulgaria U21 on 11 October 2008 in a friendly match against Greece U21.

References

External links
 
 footmercato profile 

1988 births
Living people
Bulgarian footballers
First Professional Football League (Bulgaria) players
PFC Litex Lovech players
PFC Lokomotiv Mezdra players
OFC Sliven 2000 players
PFC Slavia Sofia players
Botev Plovdiv players
Ethnikos Achna FC players
Expatriate footballers in Cyprus
People from Lovech
Association football defenders